Velutaria is a genus of fungi within the Hyaloscyphaceae family.

References

External links
Index Fungorum

Hyaloscyphaceae